
This is a timeline of Romanian history, comprising important legal and territorial changes and political events in Romania and its predecessor states. To read about the background to these events, see History of Romania.

 Millennia: 1st BC1st2nd3rd
Centuries: 5th BC4th BC3rd BC2nd BC1st BC1st2nd3rd4th5th6th7th8th9th10th11th12th13th14th15th16th17th18th19th20th21st

1st millennium BC 
Centuries: 5th BC4th BC3rd BC2nd BC1st BC

5th century BC

4th century BC

3rd century BC

2nd century BC

1st century BC

1st millennium 
Centuries: 1st2nd3rd4th5th6th7th8th9th10th

1st century

2nd century

3rd century

4th century

5th century

6th century

7th century

8th century

9th century

10th century

2nd millennium 
Centuries: 11th12th13th14th15th16th17th18th19th20th

11th century

12th century

13th century

14th century

15th century

16th century

17th century

18th century

19th century

20th century

3rd millennium 
Centuries: 21st

21st century

See also 
Cities in Romania
 Timeline of Bucharest
 Timeline of Cluj-Napoca
 Timeline of Iași
 Timeline of Sibiu

Further reading

References

External links 
 

 
Years in Romania
Romania